Cassandra Khaw (born 31 August 1984) is a Malaysian writer of horror and science fiction. They also create video games and tabletop games, and formerly wrote about them as a games and tech journalist.

Biography

Cassandra Khaw was born in Malaysia on 31 August 1984 as Zoe Khaw Joo Ee. They work as a horror and science fiction writer for video games, tabletop RPGs, short stories and novels. Their articles and stories have been published in such magazines as Tor.com, Clarkesworld, Fireside Fiction, Uncanny Magazine, and Nature. Their video game writing appears in Eurogamer, Ars Technica, The Verge and Engadget. Khaw works for Ubisoft as a scriptwriter. They use they/them pronouns.

Bibliography

Gods & Monsters

Rupert Wong

 Rupert Wong, Cannibal Chef (2015) [SF]
 Rupert Wong and the Ends of the Earth (2017) [SF]
 The Last Supper Before Ragnarok (2019)
 Food of the Gods (2017) [C]

Anthologies
 Southeast Asian Urban Anthologies
 Flesh: A Southeast Asian Urban Anthology (2016) with Angeline Woon

Chapbooks
 Rupert Wong, Cannibal Chef (2015)
 Hammers on Bone (2016)
 Rupert Wong and the Ends of the Earth (2017)
 Bearly a Lady (2017)
 A Song for Quiet (2017)
 Baby Shower (2018)
 Dreadnought (2018)

Short fiction (series)

Born to the Blade
 Baby Shower (2018)
 Dreadnought (2018)

Persons Non Grata
 Hammers on Bone (2016)
 A Song for Quiet (2017)

Short fiction
 Disconnect (2014)
 What the Highway Prefers (2015)
 Red String (2015)
 An Ocean of Eyes (2015)
 In the Rustle of Pages (2015)
 Her Pound of Flesh (2015)
 The Man Who Buys Giggles (2015)
 When We Die on Mars (2015)
 Clown Shoes (2016)
 Every Instance of You (2016)
 The Games We Play (2016)
 Breathe (2016)
 Some Breakable Things (2016)
 Speak (2016)
 The Price of Small Joys (2016)
 Degrees of Beauty (2016)
 And in Our Daughters, We Find a Voice (2016)
 For the Things We Never Said (2016)
 Hungry Ghosts (2016)
 What to Do When It's Nothing but Static (2017)
 Goddess, Worm (2017)
 The Ghost Stories We Tell Around Photon Fires (2017)
 Radio Werewolf (2017)
 The Day They Found the Train (2017)
 Saudade (2017)
 Bearly a Lady (2017)
 Custom-Made (2017)
 I Built This City for You (2017)
 Masterclass (2017)
 These Deathless Bones (2017)
 The Truth That Lies Under Skin and Meat (2017)
 Degrees of Ellision (2017)
 Don't Turn on the Lights (2017)
 Kiss, Don't Tell (2017)
 A Secret of Devils (2017)
 Landmark (2017)
 The Quiet Like a Homecoming (2018)
 A Priest of Vast and Distant Places (2018)
 You Do Nothing but Freefall (2018) with A. Maus
 She Who Hungers, She Who Waits (2018)
 How the Spider Got Her Legs (2018)
 Four Revelations from the Rusalka Ball (2018)
 Recite Her the Names of Pain (2018)
 And Was Jerusalem Builded Here? (2018)
 Shooting Iron (2018) with Jonathan L. Howard
 Bargains by the Slant-Light (2018)
 Monologue by an unnamed mage, recorded at the brink of the end (2018)
 Nepenthe (2019)
 What We Have Chosen to Love (2019)
 Mighty Are the Meek and the Myriad (2019)
 Nothing But Blackened Teeth (2021)

Poems
 Protestations Against the Idea of Anglicization (2017)
 My Mama (2017)
 Apathetic Goblin Nightmare Woman (2017)
 Found Discarded: A Love Poem, Questionably Addressed. (2018)
 Octavia's Letter to Marcus Anthony on the Discovery of His Faithlessness (2018)
 A Letter from One Woman to Another (2019)
 Instructions for When You've Endured as Much as You Can (2019)

Tabletop games

 Van Richten's Guide to Ravenloft (writer, Wizards of the Coast, 2021)
 Critical Role: Call of the Netherdeep (writer, Wizards of the Coast, 2022)

Video games
 World of Horror (co-writer, 2020)

References

External links 

 
 

1984 births
Living people
Malaysian writers
Malaysian expatriates in Canada
Video game writers